Kilkeel is a small town, civil parish and townland (of 554 acres and 6521inh) in County Down, Northern Ireland. It is the southernmost town in Northern Ireland. It lies within the historic barony of Mourne. Kilkeel town is the main fishing port on the Down coast, and its harbour is home to the largest fishing fleet in Northern Ireland. It had a population of 6,541 people at the 2011 Census. The town contains the ruins of a 14th-century church and fort, winding streets and terraced shops. It lies just south of the Mourne Mountains.

Geography
Kilkeel town sits on a plain south of the Mourne Mountains, west of where the Kilkeel River flows south into the North Channel. The town is centred in the townland of Magheramurphy, and extends into the neighbouring townlands of:
Derryoge
Drumcro
Dunnaman
Kilkeel

Altogether there are 69 townlands in the civil parish and barony.

History

Kilkeel takes its name from the old church overlooking the town, it being the anglicised version of the Gaelic 'Cill Chaoil' meaning "church of the narrow place". The name may be drawn from the church's location on a narrow site between the Aughrim and Kilkeel rivers. The church was built in 1388 and dedicated to "St Colman Del Mourne". It was thought to be the principal church in a group which included Kilmegan and Kilcoo despite the fact that Kilkeel was very sparsely populated in the Middle Ages. There are references to Kilkeel as a Christian settlement as far back as the 11th century.

The cemetery attached to the church was used for burials until 1916. The last burials at the cemetery were victims of a collision between two steamers, the Retriever and the SS Connemara, in Carlingford Lough.

The Mary Joseph (N55) is now in the Ulster Folk and Transport Museum at Cultra.

A local history group, set up in the 1980s and covering both the town of Kilkeel and the Mourne region, has produced a set of seven periodicals called The 12 Miles of Mourne. A book on Hanna's Close, a clachan of houses in Aughnahoory townland one mile outside of Kilkeel, that covers the history of the region up to 1798, was self-published in 2008.

Economy
 Fishing is a major industry in Kilkeel, with Kilkeel Harbour the home port for the largest fishing fleet in Northern Ireland.
 There are fish-processing factories around the port, pleasure angling off the piers and lobster farming along the coastline. 
 In recent years Collins Aerospace (previously known as BE Aerospace and Rockwell Collins) has become the largest employer in the area. Its Kilkeel facility, which manufactures aircraft seats for a worldwide customer base,  employs over 800 people.

People

The town is also known as the location where the 19th-century serial killer William Hare died.

Demography
On Census day (27 March 2011) there were 6,541 people living in Kilkeel (2,557 households), accounting for 0.36% of the Northern Ireland total. Of these:

 21.27% were aged under 16 years and 15.15% were aged 65 and over;
 51.49% of the usually resident population were female and 48.51% were male;
 54.00% belong to or were brought up in a 'Protestant and Other Christian (including Christian related)' religion and 40.99% belong to or were brought up in the  Christian Catholic denomination;
 54.67% indicated that they had a British national identity, 27.60% had a Northern Irish national identity and 20.29% had an Irish national identity (respondents could indicate more than one national identity);
 35 years was the average (median) age of the population;
 8.93% had some knowledge of Ulster-Scots and 8.82% had some knowledge of Irish (Gaelic).

Religion
The town of Kilkeel currently has a Unionist majority. In 2001, the ward of Kilkeel Central was recorded as 69% Protestant (21% Catholic, 10% other), and the ward of Kilkeel South was 37% Protestant (55% Catholic, 7% other).

Kilkeel now sits within the administrative area of Newry, Mourne and Down District Council which is recorded in the 2011 census as being 72.32% from a Catholic religious background and 23.91% from a Protestant religious background. In the district 44.31% indicated that they had an Irish national identity, 30.39% had a Northern Irish national identity and 28.53% had a British national identity. For more details see: NI Neighbourhood Information Service

Education
Brackenagh West Primary School
Grange Primary School
Holy Cross Primary School
Gaelscoil na mBeann is a bilingual primary school that uses the Irish language as its primary medium of instruction while English is introduced at Primary 3. The school teaches the Northern Ireland curriculum. It was established in 2010 by a group of local people and parents who wanted Gaelic-medium education for their children. The school gained recognition and funding from the Department of Education in 2012.
Kilkeel High School
Kilkeel Primary School
Mourne Independent Christian School
St Colman's Primary School
St. Columban's College
St. Louis Grammar School
Mourne Grange Village School

Sport
Most popular sports in the Kilkeel area include football, hockey, Gaelic football, fishing, golf, hurling, and swimming.

There are five Gaelic Athletic Association clubs in the area: An Ríocht, Longstone, Atticall, Ballymartin, and Glasdrumman, with associated bars, facilities and community activities.
Kilkeel Elks Basketball Club is based at An Ríocht Hall.

Kilkeel Hockey Club play at McAuley Park, and is the only hockey club in Mourne.

The most senior football team is Valley Rangers Football Club of the Mid-Ulster Football League. Other local teams include Balleyvea FC, Kilkeel Athletic and the Mourne Rovers.
There is a golf course at Kilkeel Golf Club and a pitch and putt course at Cranfield.

Peerage title
Baron Kilkeel is a title in the peerage of the United Kingdom. It was created on 19 May 2018 by Queen Elizabeth II as a substantive title for her grandson Prince Harry on the occasion of his marriage to Meghan Markle. It is named after the town of Kilkeel. The full title and designation of the barony is "Baron Kilkeel, of Kilkeel in the County of Down".

See also
Kilkeel (civil parish)
Tullaghmurray Lass
List of towns and villages in Northern Ireland
List of localities in Northern Ireland by population
List of RNLI stations

References

 
Towns in County Down
Civil parish of Kilkeel
Fishing communities in Northern Ireland
Port cities and towns in Northern Ireland
Ports and harbours of Northern Ireland